For the Canadian airline company, see KD Air.

KD Avia, sometimes called Kaliningrad Avia, was an airline based in Kaliningrad, Russia. It operated scheduled services within Russia, CIS and Europe. Its main base was Khrabrovo Airport, Kaliningrad.

History 
The airline was established on 8 October 1945 and started operations in 1946. It launched international services in 2004 and announced on 27 May 2005 that it was to change its name from Kaliningrad Avia to KD Avia, to differentiate itself from the state-owned company of the same name which operates from Khrabrovo Airport.

In 2005, the airline started a fleet renovation project and removed from operation its Tupolev Tu-134 and Tupolev Tu-154 aircraft, replacing them with Boeing 737-300s, acquired from a wide variety of other airlines. The first Boeing 737-300 was delivered to the airline in February 2005, and by the end of the year, six were in operation. During 2005, the airline operated scheduled flights from Kaliningrad to Moscow and St. Petersburg, as well as charter flights from Moscow, Kaliningrad and other Russian cities to destinations in Turkey, Egypt and Europe.

The airline was investing into building a new modern passenger terminal in Khrabrovo airport which would be the main transit hub in a hub-and-spoke system of routes, which the airline was planning to introduce on 15 June 2007. In the first stage, up to 13 cities of the Russian Federation would be connected with 13–15 cities of Europe by transit flights via Kaliningrad.

The concept of the airline was to connect Russia and other CIS countries with Europe.

On 4 September 2009, it was announced KD Avia would have its operating certificate revoked on 14 September 2009, with ceasure of all flights.

On 8 September 2009, KD Avia suspended its flights.

On 2 December 2009, the company's owner Sergei Grishchenko and executive director Leonid Itskov were charged with abuse of power and intentional bankruptcy. According to the prosecution, Grischenko and Itskov conducted a lot of deals with companies affiliated personally with Grishchenko that made no financial sense for KD Avia and led to company insolvency.

Former destinations

Asia
Kazakhstan
Nur-Sultan (Nursultan Nazarbayev International Airport)
Israel
Tel Aviv (Ben Gurion International Airport)

Europe
Czech Republic
Prague (Ruzyně International Airport)
France
Paris (Charles de Gaulle Airport)
Germany
Berlin (Berlin Tegel Airport)
Düsseldorf (Düsseldorf Airport)
Hamburg (Hamburg Airport)
Hanover (Hannover Airport)
Munich (Munich Airport)
Italy
Milan (Malpensa International Airport)
Russia
Chelyabinsk (Chelyabinsk Balandino Airport)
Kaliningrad (Khrabrovo Airport), hub
Kazan (Kazan International Airport)
Moscow
Domodedovo International Airport
Sheremetyevo International Airport
Omsk (Tsentralny Airport)
Perm (Bolshoye Savino Airport)
Rostov-on-Don (Rostov-on-Don Airport)
Saint Petersburg (Pulkovo Airport)
Samara (Samara Kurumoch Airport)
Ufa (Ufa International Airport)
Yekaterinburg (Koltsovo Airport)
Spain
Barcelona (Barcelona International Airport)
Netherlands
Amsterdam (Amsterdam Airport Schiphol)
Ukraine
Kyiv (Boryspil International Airport)
 United Kingdom
 London (London Gatwick Airport)

Fleet 
The KD Avia fleet consisted of the following aircraft (at September 2009):

On 29 May 2008, KD Avia placed a commitment with Airbus for the purchase of 25 A319-100s to replace the ageing 737-300s. None were delivered.

Incidents and accidents
On 1 October 2008, Flight 794 from Barcelona to Kaliningrad, operated by a Boeing 737-300 (registered EI-DON), made a wheels-up landing resulting in severe damage to the aircraft. On their second approach after a go-around, the crew forgot to lower the gear while manually switching off the related alarm and performed the wheels-up landing on its second approach to Kaliningrad. None of the 138 passengers and six crew on board were injured.

References

External links

KD Avia
KD Avia UK
KD Avia Europe (English)
KD Avia fleet (archive)

Defunct airlines of Russia
Companies based in Kaliningrad
Airlines established in 1945
Airlines disestablished in 2009
Defunct European low-cost airlines